Wolica  is a village in the administrative district of Gmina Karczmiska, within Opole Lubelskie County, Lublin Voivodeship, in eastern Poland.

In 2005 the village had a population of 240.

References

Wolica